"Me Gusta Todo de Ti" is a Spanish-language song written by Horacio Palencia and recorded by Mexican ensemble Banda El Recodo.
It  is also the lead single from the album of the same name . The song reached #1 on the Top Latin Songs in late 2009.

Charts

Weekly charts

Year-end charts

Decade-end charts

See also
List of number-one Billboard Top Latin Songs of 2010

References

2009 singles
Banda el Recodo songs
2009 songs
Fonovisa Records singles